The 2014 Indy Lights season was a season of open wheel motor racing. It was the 29th season of the Indy Lights series and the 13th sanctioned by IndyCar, acting as the primary support series for the IndyCar Series. It began March 30, 2014 in St. Petersburg. The 2014 season was the first promoted by Andersen Promotions, who also promotes the other steps on the Mazda Road to Indy.

It was the final season for the Dallara IPS/Infiniti V8 chassis and engine package that debuted in 2002. A new chassis, to be built by Dallara, will be introduced for 2015 along with an AER turbocharged 4-cylinder engine. 2014 was also the first season with Cooper Tire as the sole tire supplier, replacing Firestone who had supplied tires to the series for its entire previous existence.

Colombian-American Gabby Chaves, driving for Belardi Auto Racing captured the championship on the second tie-breaker over Schmidt Peterson Motorsports rookie Jack Harvey.

Early on, the season appeared to be a two-horse race between Chaves and Andretti Autosport's Zach Veach. However, a late-season charge by Harvey put him within striking distance of the championship. Harvey did not capture his first win until the tenth race of the season. However, Chaves managed a second-place finish in the final race of the season behind Harvey in first. Chaves and Harvey tied on points and on the first tie-breaker number of wins with four each. Chaves captured the championship by having five second-place finishes to Harvey's one. Despite a season of low car-counts where only eight drivers competed in all 14 races, six different drivers captured victories. In addition to Chaves, Harvey, and Veach, other winners included Matthew Brabham and Luiz Razia who each captured their first and only wins of the season on the Indianapolis Motor Speedway road course and Belardi's Alexandre Baron – a race-winner in Toronto – who was in the championship hunt until reported visa issues forced him to leave the series.

Team and driver chart
 All drivers competed in Cooper Tire–shod Dallara chassis.

Schedule
Andersen Promotions announced the 2014 Indy Lights schedule on October 24, 2013. The season consisted of 14 races held over 10 race weekends, consisting of three street circuits, three ovals, and four permanent road courses. All race weekends on permanent road courses were double-race weekends. The series returned to Sonoma Raceway for the first time since 2010. It also raced on the Indianapolis Motor Speedway road course for the first time since 2007 in support of the new Grand Prix of Indianapolis, although the track was in a different configuration than the one raced in 2007. The series did not return to Iowa Speedway, Auto Club Speedway, or Houston despite IndyCar returning to those tracks in 2014 and did not race at the Baltimore Grand Prix as that race was cancelled for 2014.

Race results

Championship standings

Drivers' championship
Points system

 Drivers had to complete 50% of the race distance in order to score full points, otherwise 1 point was awarded.

 Ties in points broken by number of wins, or best finishes.

Teams' championship

References

External links
 

Indy Lights seasons
Indy Lights
Indy Lights